Strolia is a Lithuanian surname. Notable people with the surname include:

Mantas Strolia (born 1986), Lithuanian Olympic cross-country skier
Vytautas Strolia (born 1992), Lithuanian Olympic cross-country skier

Lithuanian-language surnames